FC Alliance Äischdall Hobscheid-Eischen is an association football club based in Hobscheid, in western Luxembourg.

History
The club was founded in 2007 following the amalgamation of CS Hobscheid and FC Olympique Eischen. For the 2021–22 season, they play in the Luxembourg 1. Division, the third tier of the Luxembourg football pyramid.

Alliance Äischdall play their home matches at the Stade Koericherberg, the former ground of CS Hobscheid, which has a capacity of 2,120.

Honours

Domestic
as Olympique Eischen

Cup
Luxembourg Cup
Runners-up (1): 1981

References
Club information at the Luxembourg Football Federation
Club history by weltfussballarchiv.com

External links
Official website

Football clubs in Luxembourg
Association football clubs established in 2007
2007 establishments in Luxembourg